Doctor Midnight & The Mercy Cult (DMTMC) was a supergroup formed in 2009. The band made its live debut in Helsinki, Finland, on 11 May 2011 at club DOM followed by shows in Oslo, Stockholm and Örebro. 

DMTMC's debut single, "(Don't) Waste It", was released on 9 May 2011. Their debut album, I Declare: Treason, was released on 6 June 2011 by Season of Mist. Peek-a-boo Magazine rated the album 76/100. Sea of Tranquility rated the album two stars. MetalSucks rated the album one-and-a-half out of five horns.

Members
Hank von Helvete – vocals (Turbonegro)
Tim Sköld – bass (Marilyn Manson, KMFDM, MDFMK, Shotgun Messiah, Skold)
Anders Odden – guitars (Cadaver, Satyricon, Celtic Frost, Magenta)
Audun Stengel – guitars (Apoptygma Berzerk, The Kovenant)
David Husvik – drums (Extol)

Discography

Single
"(Don't) Waste It" (9 May 2011)

Album
I Declare: Treason (6 June 2011)

Track listing
 "You Are God – Intro"
 "Sign My Name"
 "I Declare: Treason"
 "Bleed Idiot Bleed"
 "(Don't) Waste It"
 "Blame Is the Game"
 "OK (We're Just About to Die)"
 "Misconception"
 "Glory (Throw the Axe)"
 "Revenge"
 "Victorious"

References

External links
Official Webpage

2009 establishments in Norway
2011 disestablishments in Norway
Norwegian musical groups
Musical groups established in 2009
Musical groups disestablished in 2011